The 2010 Women's Hockey South American Championship was the fourth edition of the Women's South American Hockey Championship. It was held between 3–10 April 2010 in Rio de Janeiro, Brazil.

Argentina won the tournament for the fourth time after defeating Chile 4–0 in the final. Uruguay won the bronze medal after defeating Brazil 5–0 in the third place match.

Umpires
The following umpires were appointed by the Pan American Hockey Federation to officiate the tournament:

 Miskamalia Ariffin (SGP)
 Amber Church (NZL)
 Maggie Giddens (USA)
 Meghan McLennan (CAN)
 Catalina Montesino Wenzel (CHL)
 Maricel Sanchez (ARG)
 Suzzie Sutton (USA)

Results

Preliminary round

Classification round

Fifth and sixth place

Third and fourth place

Final

Statistics

Awards

Final standings

External links

References

South American Championship
International women's field hockey competitions hosted by Brazil
Women's Hockey South American Championship
Sports competitions in Rio de Janeiro (city)
Women's South American Hockey Championship
Hockey South American Championship
Women's Hockey South American Championship